Studenti Volley a men's volleyball team based in Tiranë. The club is considered to be one of the best in the country, having won 14 league titles out of a possible 17 since 2000. The men's volleyball department is the most successful department within the Student Sports Club.

References

Albanian volleyball clubs
Sport in Tirana